The 61st Golden Globe Awards, honoring the best in film and television for 2003, were held on January 25, 2004 at the Beverly Hilton Hotel in Beverly Hills, California. The nominations were announced on December 18, 2003.

The Lord of the Rings: The Return of the King won the most awards, with 4 (including Best Motion Picture – Drama). Cold Mountain received the most nominations, with 8 (winning 1, Best Supporting Actress). Big Fish had the most nominations (4) without a single win.

Winners and nominees

These are the nominees for the 61st Golden Globe Awards. Winners are listed at the top of each list.

Film

The following films received multiple nominations:

The following films received multiple wins:

Television

The following programs received multiple nominations:

The following programs received multiple wins:

Ceremony

Presenters 

 Jennifer Aniston
 Antonio Banderas
 Tyra Banks
 Jim Belushi
 Cate Blanchett
 Jeff Bridges
 Pierce Brosnan
 Ellen Burstyn
 Nicolas Cage
 Jim Carrey
 Kim Cattrall
 Chris Cooper
 Ice Cube
 Kristin Davis
 Ellen DeGeneres
 Danny DeVito
 Leonardo DiCaprio
 Sarah Ferguson
 Richard Gere
 Melanie Griffith
 Marg Helgenberger
 Dustin Hoffman
 Nicole Kidman
 Justin Kirk
 Ashton Kutcher
 Matt LeBlanc
 Jennifer Lopez
 Eva Mendes
 Brittany Murphy
 Jack Nicholson
 Cynthia Nixon
 Sarah Jessica Parker
 Queen Latifah
 Keanu Reeves
 Christina Ricci
 Mark Ruffalo
 Susan Sarandon
 Gwen Stefani
 Sharon Stone
 Meryl Streep
 Uma Thurman
 Robin Williams
 Elijah Wood
 Renee Zellweger

Cecil B. DeMille Award 
Michael Douglas

Miss Golden Globe 
Lily Costner (daughter of Kevin Costner & Cindy Costner)

Awards breakdown 
The following networks received multiple nominations:

The following networks received multiple wins:

See also
 76th Academy Awards
 24th Golden Raspberry Awards
 10th Screen Actors Guild Awards
 55th Primetime Emmy Awards
 56th Primetime Emmy Awards
 57th British Academy Film Awards
 58th Tony Awards
 2003 in film
 2003 in American television

References

061
2003 film awards
2003 television awards
Golden Globe
January 2004 events in the United States
Golden